The white-crowned lapwing, white-headed lapwing, white-headed plover or white-crowned plover (Vanellus albiceps) is a medium-sized wader. It is resident throughout tropical Africa, usually near large rivers.

Description

This lapwing is unmistakable. Its wings and tail are strikingly patterned in black and white, the back is brown and the underparts white. The head is particularly striking, being mainly grey, but with a white crown and foreneck. The eyering, facial wattles and legs are yellow. Females, males and young birds are similar in plumage.

Behaviour
It is a wader which breeds on exposed sand or shingle near rivers. 2–3 eggs are laid in a ground scrape. The nest and young are defended noisily and aggressively against all intruders, up to and including the hippopotamus.

Food is mainly insects and other small invertebrates. This species often feeds in small flocks when not breeding.

Status
The white-crowned lapwing is one of the species to which the Agreement on the Conservation of African-Eurasian Migratory Waterbirds (AEWA) applies.

References

Shorebirds by Hayman, Marchant and Prater

External links
 White-crowned plover - Species text in The Atlas of Southern African Birds.

white-crowned lapwing
Birds of Sub-Saharan Africa
white-crowned lapwing
Taxa named by John Gould